Nelson Castro may refer to:

Nelson Castro (politician) (born 1972), member of the New York State Assembly
Nelson Castro (weightlifter) (born 1974), former Olympian from Colombia 
Nelson Castro (journalist) (born 1955), Argentine journalist, doctor and writer
Nélson Oliveira (born 1991), Portuguese footballer, full name Nelson Castro Oliveira